Pegas may refer to:

 Meletius I Pegas (1549–1601), Greek Patriarch of Alexandria
 Pegas (bicycle company), a Romanian bicycle manufacturer
 Pegas 2000, a Czech manufacturer of paragliders and other aircraft
 Tomashevich Pegas, a WWII Soviet prototype aircraft
 Kia Pegas, a Chinese car model
 Pegas Fly, a Russian airline
 Pegas Touristik, a Russian tour operator

See also 
 Pegasus (disambiguation)